The Harøya Wetlands System is a Ramsar site located on Harøya island in the municipality of Ålesund in Møre og Romsdal county, Norway. It consists of six separate protected areas: three nature reserves plus a large wildlife sanctuary containing two smaller bird sanctuaries.

The areas have been protected as a Ramsar site since 1996 because of their importance for migratory birds. Harøya has large shallow areas with mudflats where seaweed collects. In the inner parts of the island there are marshy areas, and along the beaches there are damp beach meadows. The island is important as an overwintering area and resting area for birds migrating in the spring and fall.

The protected areas are: 
 The Selvikvågen Nature Reserve, established on May 27, 1988
 The Lomstjønna Nature Reserve, established on May 27, 1988
 The Malesanden and Huse Wildlife Sanctuary, established on May 27, 1988, a  buffer zone with two subareas covering :
 The Malesanden Bird Sanctuary
 The Huse Bird Sanctuary
 The Lyngholman Nature Reserve, established on May 27, 1988

References

External links
Harøya våtmarkssystem: kort områdeskildring (Harøya Wetlands System: A Brief Description of the Area) 

Nature reserves in Norway
Ramsar sites in Norway
Protected areas of Møre og Romsdal
Ålesund
Protected areas established in 1996